Podhradík is a village and municipality in Prešov District in the Prešov Region of eastern Slovakia.

History
In historical records the village was first mentioned in 1427.

Geography

References

External links
 
 
http://www.statistics.sk/mosmis/eng/run.html
http://podhradik.sk/

Villages and municipalities in Prešov District
Šariš